Chamaetylas is a genus of small, mainly insectivorous birds in the Old World flycatcher family Muscicapidae that are native to sub-Saharan Africa.

The genus was introduced by the German ornithologist Ferdinand Heine in 1860. Species in the genus were previously assigned to the genus Alethe which was included in the thrush family Turdidae. In 2010 two separate molecular phylogenetic studies found that Alethe was polyphyletic and that the members of both clades were better placed in the Old World flycatcher family Muscicapidae.

The genus contains four species:
 Red-throated alethe, Chamaetylas poliophrys
 White-chested alethe, Chamaetylas fuelleborni
 Brown-chested alethe, Chamaetylas poliocephala
 Thyolo alethe, Chamaetylas choloensis

References

 
Bird genera